United Nations Security Council resolution 476, adopted on 30 June 1980, declared that "all legislative and administrative measures and actions taken by Israel, the occupying Power, which purport to alter the character and status of the Holy City of Jerusalem have no legal validity and constitute a flagrant violation of the Fourth Geneva Convention".

The resolution was adopted by 14 votes to none, with the United States abstaining.

See also
 Israeli–Palestinian conflict
 List of United Nations Security Council Resolutions 401 to 500 (1976–1982)
 Status of Jerusalem

References

External links
 

 0476
 0476
20th century in Jerusalem
Israeli–Palestinian conflict and the United Nations
June 1980 events